Olbramov is a municipality and village in Tachov District in the Plzeň Region of the Czech Republic. It has about 70 inhabitants.

Administrative parts
Hamlets of Kořen and Zádub are administrative parts of Olbramov.

References

Villages in Tachov District